is a railway station on the Hankyū Kyōto Main Line in Settsu, Osaka, Japan. The newest station of the Hankyu system as of 2010 was built for a redevelopment area and is designed as the country's first ever carbon neutral station.

Line 
Hankyu Railway
Kyōto Main Line

The station is served by local trains on the Kyōto Main Line. All higher types of trains pass the station.

Layout 
The station has two side platforms, connected each other by an underground passage, serving two tracks. Each platform has a ticket gate that serves each side of the station.

Carbon neutrality 
The station was featured as the first ever carbon neutral railway station in Japan. According to an estimate in 2008, the station would emit 65 tons of carbon dioxide per year. To make the station carbon neutral, the railway company would reduce this figure by 35 tons by technical measures such as usage of solar power, regeneration by elevators, and reduction of water usage. The remaining 30 tons would be offset by purchase of carbon credit and so forth.

History 
Settsu-shi Station opened on 14 March 2010.

Station numbering was introduced to all Hankyu stations on 21 December 2013 with this station being designated as station number HK-67.

Adjacent stations

References

External links
 Settsu-shi Station from Hankyu Railway website

Hankyu Kyoto Main Line
Railway stations in Japan opened in 2010
Railway stations in Osaka Prefecture
Settsu, Osaka